Statistics and Its Interface is a quarterly peer-reviewed open access scientific journal covering the interface between the field of statistics and other disciplines. The journal was established in 2008 and is published by International Press. The editor-in-chief is Heping Zhang (Yale University). The journal is abstracted and indexed in MathSciNet, Science Citation Index Expanded, and Zentralblatt MATH. According to the Journal Citation Reports, the journal has a 2014 impact factor of 2.933  -  the second highest among all statistical journals that publish original articles.

References

External links 
 

Statistics journals
International Press academic journals
Quarterly journals
English-language journals
Publications established in 2008